Eduard Rudolf Thurneysen (March 14, 1857 – 9 August 1940) was a Swiss linguist and Celticist.

Biography 
Born in Basel, Thurneysen studied classical philology in Basel, Leipzig, Berlin and Paris. His teachers included Ernst Windisch and Heinrich Zimmer. He received his promotion (approximating to a doctorate) in 1879 and his habilitation, in Latin and the Celtic languages, followed at the University of Jena in 1882.

From 1885 to 1887 he taught Latin at Jena, then taking up the Chair of Comparative Philology at the University of Freiburg where he replaced Karl Brugmann, a renowned expert in Indo-European studies.

In 1896, he posited Thurneysen's law, a proposed sound law concerning the alternation of voiced and voiceless fricatives in certain affixes in Gothic; it was later published in 1898.

In 1909 Thurneysen published his , translated into English as A Grammar of Old Irish by D. A. Binchy and Osborn Bergin, and still in print as of 2006. A version in Welsh was produced by Melville Richards and published by Gwasg Prifysgol Cymru (University of Wales Press) in 1935 under the title Llawlyfr Hen Wyddeleg. In 1913 he moved to the University of Bonn. It is in this period that Thurneysen has been called the greatest living authority on Old Irish.

He retired in 1923 and died in Bonn in 1940. The Rudolf Thurneysen Memorial Lecture, given at Bonn, is named in his honour.

Select bibliography
 . Leipzig 1879.
 . Halle 1884.
 . Halle 1885.
  1887.
    Halle 1892.
 . Berlin 1901.
 . Freiburg 1905.
 , vol. 1: ; vol. 2: . Heidelberg 1909. 
 A Grammar of Old Irish. Revised and enlarged, with supplement. Translated by D. A. Binchy & Osborn Bergin. Dublin: School of Celtic Studies, Dublin Institute for Advanced Studies, 1975 (1st edn. 1946; reprint 2003). 
 Old Irish Reader. Translated by D. A. Binchy & Osborn Bergin. Dublin: Dublin Institute for Advanced Studies, 1949 (reprints 1975, 1981). 
 . Halle 1921.
 . Dublin: Dublin Institute for Advanced Studies, 1986 (reprint 2004).

References

External links

 Thurneysen-Archiv der Keltologie Bonn
 Works by Thurneysen online at University College Cork's CELT project
 Select bibliography at University College Cork's CELT project
  TITUS-Galeria: Pictures of Rudolf Thurneysen

1857 births
1940 deaths
Linguists from Switzerland
Celtic studies scholars
Academic staff of the University of Bonn
Oghamologists
Corresponding Fellows of the Medieval Academy of America